Amala Education (previously Sky School) is a UK-based charity that provides high school education to refugees.

Organisation 
Amala Education is a London, England based charity that provides high school level education for refugees.

The organisation was founded in 2016 by Polly Akhurst and Mia Eskelund Pedersen, and was originally called Sky School. It is registered charity number 1181373 in England and Wales.

The learning is delivered to refugees through organisations working in refuges camps that are coordinated by the United Nations High Commissioner for Refugees, including in Kakuma refugee camp. In 2017, 60% of learning was delivered in person, 40% was delivered online.

References

External links 

 Official website

Refugee aid organisations in the United Kingdom
2016 establishments in England
Educational charities based in the United Kingdom